Azizol Abu Haniffah was a midfielder with Perak FA and former Malaysia national team footballer. Azizol, a player with high skills equals previous midfield legends such as Shukor Salleh and Wong Choon Wah. He also well known for having involved in 1994 Malaysian football scandal and severely punished, thus ending his football career at aged of 29.

Career Overview 
He start played for Perak FA since 1983. In the same year, Azizol made his international debut which ended in a 3–1 Won against Saudi Arabia in 1984 Summer Olympics – Asian qualification at the age of 18. In 1990, he captained Perak FA to win the inaugural competition of Malaysia FA Cup by beating Selangor FA 4–2. With the national team, he won the 1989 Southeast Asian Games gold medal and 1993 Merdeka Tournament. He played 71 times and scored 8 goals for the Malaysia national football team.

On 17 September 2014, FourFourTwo list him on their list of the top 25 Malaysian footballers of all time.

Honours

Perak
Liga Semi-Pro Divisyen 2 promotion: 1989
Malaysia FA Cup: 1990; runner-up 1991

Malaysia
Pestabola Merdeka: 1993
SEA Games: 1989

Individual
AFC Asian Team of the Year First XI: 1991
Malaysian Player of The Year: 1991

References

External links
 Player statistics at FIFA.com

Living people
Malaysian footballers
Perak F.C. players
People from Perak
Footballers at the 1990 Asian Games
Association football midfielders
Asian Games competitors for Malaysia
1960 births
Footballers at the 1994 Asian Games